The BPost Bank Trophy 2012-2013 began on October 14 with the GP Mario De Clercq and finished on February 24 in Oostmalle. The men's elite competition was won by the Belgian Niels Albert while the women's elite was won by Sanne Cant, also of Belgium. The bank of the Belgian Post Group took over the sponsorship of this event, formerly known as Gazet van Antwerpen trofee.

Since this season, the ranking is no longer decided by points classification, but by time difference. This is a method well known from road racing. All riders that do not start in a race, do not finish the race or finish more than 5 minutes behind the winner receive 5 minutes delay on the winner in the ranking and are still in the race for the overall title. Time bonuses can be earned: during each race there is a sprint in which the first three riders gain 15, 10 and 5 seconds respectively. The same time bonuses are given at the finish.

Calendar

Ranking (top 10)

Results

Ronse

Oudenaarde

Hasselt

Essen

Loenhout

Baal

Lille

Notes

References

External links 
 Website bpost bank Trofee

Cyclo-cross BPost Bank Trophy
2012 in cyclo-cross
2013 in cyclo-cross